, is a veteran Japanese voice actress. Born in Japan, she now lives in Seattle in the United States.

History
Run moved to the US and lives in Seattle since 2000.

Anime

Movies
Crusher Joe (6th Japan Anime Grand prize movie) (Alfin)
The Super Dimension Fortress Macross (Vannessa)
Ohayou Spank (Anna(dog))
The five star stories (Isha)
2112: The Birth of Doraemon(wife)

TV series Animation
Sarutobi Sasuke (Princess Yukino)
Ultra Grandma (baby)
God mars (boy Mars)
The Super Dimension Fortress Macross (Vanessa)
The Super Dimension Century Orguss (Mimsy Rath)
Ginga Hyōryū Vifam (maruro)
Aura Battler Dunbine (Elle)
Princess Sarah (gertrude)
Blue Comet SPT Layzner (Karura)
Pretty Soldier Sailor Moon (Naru's Mother/Morga)
Blue Comet SPT Layzner (Frevy)
Dancougar - Super Beast Machine God (Seacat)
Showa Ahozoshi Akanuke ichiban
Hikari no Densetsu (Maria)
High School! Kimengumi (Iko Kawa)
Izumo (Himiko)
Shonen Ashibe (Ka-chan)
City Hunter (Reiko Yuuki)
City Hunter (Midori O'hara)
Oishinbo (Natsuko)
Anpanman (Tamago-chan)
YAWARA! (Bellkence)
Yamato Takeru (Yamato Kaoru)
Crayon Shin-chan
Brain Powered (Kant)
Mobile Fighter G Gundam (Marion)
Astro boy (Robiet)
Urusei Yatsura (Diane)
Hello Kitty (Kitty's Mommy)
Sanrio Blue Bird (Goddess)
Seraphim Call

Voice over for Hollywood movies
CHiPs (Kathy by Tina Gayle)
City Hunter (Carol Wan)
Dragons Forever (Wen Mei-ling by Pauline Yeung)
Get Smart (Agent #99)
Harlem Nights (Dominic LaRue)
La Cage aux Folles (Andrea by Luisa Maneri)
Les Misérables (Cossete)
Love Boat (Julie MacCoy by Lauren Tewes)
Mr. Vampire (Ting-ting by Moon Lee)
Ordinary People (Karen by Dinah Manoff)
Police Story (May by Maggie Cheung)
Rush Hour (Tania Johnson by Elizabeth Peña)
thirtysomething (Nancy by Patricia Wettig)
Twin Dragons (Barbara by Maggie Cheung)
Zapped! (Heather Thomas)

Games
Sony PlayStation Kowloon's Gate (Kowloon Kid(Original Hero voice))
SEGA Jan Jan Koi shimasho! (Nana Motoki)
Marie's Atelier (Killy)

References

External links

Japanese video game actresses
Japanese voice actresses
Living people
1956 births
Japanese expatriates in the United States
20th-century Japanese actresses
21st-century Japanese actresses